This is a list of films produced by the Telugu language film industry in the year 2009.

Box office

List of films released

Dubbed films

References

Telugu
2009
2009 in Indian cinema